Stephen L. Hoffman (born July 31, 1948) is an American physician-scientist, tropical medicine specialist and vaccinologist, who is the founder and chief executive and scientific officer of Sanaria Inc., a company dedicated to developing PfSPZ vaccines to prevent malaria.

Early life and education 
Hoffman was raised initially in Belmar and subsequently in Ocean Township, Monmouth County, New Jersey. He graduated from Asbury Park High School in 1966, received a BA in political science from the University of Pennsylvania in 1970, an MD from Cornell University Medical College (now Weill Cornell Medicine) in 1975, and a Diploma in Tropical Medicine and Hygiene from the London School of Hygiene and Tropical Medicine in 1978. Additionally in 1978,  he completed a residency in Family Medicine at the University of California San Diego. He is board certified in Family Medicine and received a Certificate of Knowledge in Clinical Tropical Medicine and Travelers Health in 1998, and a Doctor of Science (DSc), honoris causa from Monmouth University in 2006.

Professional career

Work experience 
After completing his residency in 1978, Hoffman was co-founder and director of the Tropical Medicine and Travelers clinic at University Hospital, University of California, San Diego, an adjunct clinical faculty member, and an emergency room physician. In 1980, Hoffman was commissioned as a medical officer in the United States Navy and stationed in Jakarta, Indonesia at the Naval Medical Research Unit Two-Jakarta Detachment where he was the director of the Department of Clinical Investigation and Epidemiology through 1984. His initial focus was on treatment of severe, typhoid fever. He proposed and studied an intervention, which reduced the typhoid fever death rate by more than 80 percent. He also conducted research throughout the Indonesian archipelago on cholera, filariasis, and malaria.   In 1987, Hoffman returned to Bethesda, MD, and served as the director of the Malaria Program at the Naval Medical Research Institute (later Naval Medical Research Center) until 2001. Hoffman and his team worked on identifying the targets and mechanisms of protective immunity against malaria and malaria vaccine development. They were the first in the world to test a DNA vaccine in normal humans and demonstrate that DNA vaccines elicited killer T cell responses. Hoffman also led the team that sequenced the Plasmodium falciparum genome.

After retiring from the Navy, Hoffman spent two years as senior vice president of biologics at Celera Genomics, the company that sequenced the human genome.  Hoffman worked with utilizing human genomics and proteomics to develop immunotherapies and vaccines against cancer and to establish the potential for the field of personalized medicine. He also organized the sequencing of the genome of Anopheles gambiae. 

In 2003 Hoffman founded Sanaria Inc. to develop whole sporozoite malaria vaccines and has since been the chief executive and scientific officer of Sanaria Inc.

Contributions to Science and Technology 
Hoffman has over 500 scientific publications.. He has made major contributions in the following areas.

 Treatment of severe typhoid fever. He established that high dose dexamethasone treatment reduced mortality of severe typhoid fever by more than 80%.
 Understanding of pre-erythrocytic (liver) stage protective immunity against malaria. He reported the first demonstration of killing of infected hepatocytes (liver cells) by malaria sporozoite specific T cells, the first demonstration of human cytotoxic T lymphocytes against any parasite, and the complexity of protective immunity at this stage of the parasite life cycle.
 Development of DNA vaccines and prime boost approaches. He conducted the first trial of a DNA or any other nucleotide vaccine in a normal human and made the first demonstration that a DNA vaccine induced CD8+ cytotoxic T cells in humans.
 Sequencing of the genomes of Plasmodium falciparum, the parasite that causes more than 98% of deaths from malaria and Anopheles gambiae, the major malaria transmitting mosquito in Africa. He was the senior author on the papers reporting the sequences of the first Plasmodium falciparum chromosome and of Anopheles gambiae, the major mosquito vector of malaria in Africa.
 Development of whole sporozoite malaria vaccines. It has been known since the 1970s that immunization of humans by bite of mosquitoes infected with radiation attenuated P. falciparum (Pf) sporozoites (SPZ) protects these individuals. Malaria vaccine development always relied on creating subunit vaccines to try to duplicate this immunity, because it was thought to be impossible to produce a whole sporozoite vaccine that met regulatory and cost of goods standards. Hoffman conceived of the idea of developing an injectable sporozoite vaccine, and he and his team developed all the technology to manufacture whole sporozoite vaccines. Immunization with the radiation-attenuated PfSPZ Vaccine and the chemo-attenuated PfSPZ- CVac, have both been shown to induce 100% protective immunity in humans, protection that has now been shown to be durable for at least 18 months, and effective against the heterogeneous P. falciparum parasites found in high transmission areas of Mali and Burkina Faso. An international consortium has been established that has and will continue to run clinical trials at 5 sites in the U.S., Germany, 5 countries in Europe, 7 countries in Africa, and Indonesia, and is planning to submit a PfSPZ vaccine for licensure in 2024.

Selected publications 

 
 Hoffman SL, Wistar R Jr, Ballou WR, Hollingdale MR, Wirtz RA, Schneider I, Marwoto HA, Hockmeyer WT. Immunity to malaria and naturally acquired antibodies to the circumsporozoite protein of Plasmodium falciparum. N Engl J Med. 1986 Sep 4;315(10):601-6. doi: 10.1056/NEJM198609043151001. PMID: 3526148.
 
 Hoffman SL, Isenbarger D, Long GW, Sedegah M, Szarfman A, Waters L, Hollingdale MR, van der Meide PH, Finbloom DS, Ballou WR. Sporozoite vaccine induces genetically restricted T cell elimination of malaria from hepatocytes. Science. 1989 Jun 2;244(4908):1078-81. PubMed PMID: 2524877.
 Malik A, Egan JE, Houghten RA, Sadoff JC, Hoffman SL. Human cytotoxic T lymphocytes against the Plasmodium falciparum circumsporozoite protein. Proc Natl Acad Sci U S A. 1991 Apr 15;88(8):3300-4. PubMed Central PMCID: PMC51434.
 Doolan DL, Hoffman SL. The complexity of protective immunity against liver-stage malaria. J Immunol. 2000 Aug 1;165(3):1453-62. PubMed PMID: 10903750.
 Sedegah M, Hedstrom R, Hobart P, Hoffman SL. Protection against malaria by immunization with plasmid DNA encoding circumsporozoite protein. Proc Natl Acad Sci U S A. 1994 Oct 11;91(21):9866-70. PubMed Central PMCID: PMC44918.
 Sedegah M, Jones TR, Kaur M, Hedstrom R, Hobart P, Tine JA, Hoffman SL. Boosting with recombinant vaccinia increases immunogenicity and protective efficacy of malaria DNA vaccine. Proc Natl Acad Sci U S A. 1998 Jun 23;95(13):7648-53. PubMed Central PMCID: PMC22711.
 Wang R, Doolan DL, Le TP, Hedstrom RC, Coonan KM, Charoenvit Y, Jones TR, Hobart P, Margalith M, Ng J, Weiss WR, Sedegah M, de Taisne C, Norman JA, Hoffman SL. Induction of antigen-specific cytotoxic T lymphocytes in humans by a malaria DNA vaccine. Science. 1998 Oct 16;282(5388):476-80. PubMed PMID: 9774275.
 Wang R, Epstein J, Baraceros FM, Gorak EJ, Charoenvit Y, Carucci DJ, Hedstrom RC, Rahardjo N, Gay T, Hobart P, Stout R, Jones TR, Richie TL, Parker SE, Doolan DL, Norman J, Hoffman SL. Induction of CD4(+) T cell-dependent CD8(+) type 1 responses in humans by a malaria DNA vaccine. Proc Natl Acad Sci U S A. 2001 Sep 11;98(19):10817-22. PubMed Central PMCID: PMC58557.
 Gardner MJ, Tettelin H, Carucci DJ, Cummings LM, Aravind L, Koonin EV, Shallom S, Mason T, Yu K, Fujii C, Pederson J, Shen K, Jing J, Aston C, Lai Z, Schwartz DC, Pertea M, Salzberg S, Zhou L, Sutton GG, Clayton R, White O, Smith HO, Fraser CM, Adams MD, Venter JC, Hoffman SL. Chromosome 2 sequence of the human malaria parasite Plasmodium falciparum. Science. 1998 Nov 6;282(5391):1126-32. PubMed PMID: 9804551.
 Hoffman SL, Subramanian GM, Collins FH, Venter JC. Plasmodium, human and Anopheles genomics and malaria. Nature. 2002 Feb 7;415(6872):702-9. PubMed PMID: 11832959.
 Holt RA, Subramanian GM, Halpern A, Sutton GG, Charlab R, Nusskern DR, Wincker P, Clark AG, Ribeiro JM, Wides R, Salzberg SL, Loftus B, Yandell M, Majoros WH, Rusch DB, Lai Z, Kraft CL, Abril JF, Anthouard V, Arensburger P, Atkinson PW, Baden H, de Berardinis V, Baldwin D, Benes V, Biedler J, Blass C, Bolanos R, Boscus D, Barnstead M, Cai S, Center A, Chaturverdi K, Christophides GK, Chrystal MA, Clamp M, Cravchik A, Curwen V, Dana A, Delcher A, Dew I, Evans CA, Flanigan M, Grundschober-Freimoser A, Friedli L, Gu Z, Guan P, Guigo R, Hillenmeyer ME, Hladun SL, Hogan JR, Hong YS, Hoover J, Jaillon O, Ke Z, Kodira C, Kokoza E, Koutsos A, Letunic I, Levitsky A, Liang Y, Lin JJ, Lobo NF, Lopez JR, Malek JA, McIntosh TC, Meister S, Miller J, Mobarry C, Mongin E, Murphy SD, O'Brochta DA, Pfannkoch C, Qi R, Regier MA, Remington K, Shao H, Sharakhova MV, Sitter CD, Shetty J, Smith TJ, Strong R, Sun J, Thomasova D, Ton LQ, Topalis P, Tu Z, Unger MF, Walenz B, Wang A, Wang J, Wang M, Wang X, Woodford KJ, Wortman JR, Wu M, Yao A, Zdobnov EM, Zhang H, Zhao Q, Zhao S, Zhu SC, Zhimulev I, Coluzzi M, della Torre A, Roth CW, Louis C, Kalush F, Mural RJ, Myers EW, Adams MD, Smith HO, Broder S, Gardner MJ, Fraser CM, Birney E, Bork P, Brey PT, Venter JC, Weissenbach J, Kafatos FC, Collins FH, Hoffman SL. The genome sequence of the malaria mosquito Anopheles gambiae. Science. 2002 Oct 4;298(5591):129-49. PubMed PMID: 12364791.
 Hoffman SL, Goh LM, Luke TC, Schneider I, Le TP, Doolan DL, Sacci J, de la Vega P, Dowler M, Paul C, Gordon DM, Stoute JA, Church LW, Sedegah M, Heppner DG, Ballou WR, Richie TL. Protection of humans against malaria by immunization with radiation-attenuated Plasmodium falciparum sporozoites. J Infect Dis. 2002 Apr 15;185(8):1155-64. PubMed PMID: 11930326.
 Epstein JE, Tewari K, Lyke KE, Sim BK, Billingsley PF, Laurens MB, Gunasekera A, Chakravarty S, James ER, Sedegah M, Richman A, Velmurugan S, Reyes S, Li M, Tucker K, Ahumada A, Ruben AJ, Li T, Stafford R, Eappen AG, Tamminga C, Bennett JW, Ockenhouse CF, Murphy JR, Komisar J, Thomas N, Loyevsky M, Birkett A, Plowe CV, Loucq C, Edelman R, Richie TL, Seder RA, and Hoffman SL. Live attenuated malaria vaccine designed to protect through hepatic CD8 T cell immunity. Science 334: 475–480, 2011.
 Seder RA, Chang LJ, Enama ME, Zephir KL, Sarwar UN, Gordon IJ, Holman LA, James ER, Billingsley PF, Gunasekera A, Richman A, Chakravarty S, Manoj A, Velmurugan S, Li M, Ruben AJ, Li T, Eappen AG, Stafford RE, Plummer SH, Hendel CS, Novik L, Costner PJ, Mendoza FH, Saunders JG, Nason MC, Richardson JH, Murphy J, Davidson SA, Richie TL, Sedegah M, Sutamihardja A, Fahle GA, Lyke KE, Laurens MB, Roederer M, Tewari K, Epstein JE, Sim BK, Ledgerwood JE, Graham BS, Hoffman SL. Protection against malaria by intravenous immunization with a nonreplicating sporozoite vaccine. Science. 2013 Sep 20;341(6152):1359-65. PubMed PMID: 23929949.
 Sissoko MS, Healy SA, Katile A, Omaswa F, Zaidi I, Gabriel EE, Kamate B, Samake Y, Guindo MA, Dolo A, Niangaly A, Niaré K, Zeguime A, Sissoko K, Diallo H, Thera I, Ding K, Fay MP, O'Connell EM, Nutman TB, Wong-Madden S, Murshedkar T, Ruben AJ, Li M, Abebe Y, Manoj A, Gunasekera A, Chakravarty S, Sim BKL, Billingsley PF, James ER, Walther M, Richie TL, Hoffman SL, Doumbo O, Duffy PE. Safety and efficacy of PfSPZ Vaccine against Plasmodium falciparum via direct venous inoculation in healthy malaria-exposed adults in Mali: a randomised, double-blind phase 1 trial. Lancet Infect Dis. 2017 May;17(5):498-509. doi: 10.1016/S1473-3099(17)30104-4. Epub 2017 Feb 16. PMID: 28216244; PMCID: PMC6803168.
 Mordmuller B, Surat G, Lagler H, Chakravarty S, Ishizuka AS, Lalremruata A, Gmeiner M, Campo JJ, Esen M, Ruben AJ, Held J, Calle CL, Mengue JB, Gebru T, Ibanez J, Sulyok M, James ER, Billingsley PF, Natasha KC, Manoj A, Murshedkar T, Gunasekera A, Eappen AG, Li T, Stafford RE, Li M, Felgner PL, Seder RA, Richie TL, Sim BK, Hoffman SL, and Kremsner PG. Sterile protection against human malaria by chemoattenuated PfSPZ vaccine. Nature 542: 445–449, 2017.
 Sissoko MS, Healy SA, Katile A, Zaidi I, Hu Z, Kamate B, Samake Y, Sissoko K, Mwakingwe-Omari A, Lane J, Imeru A, Mohan R, Thera I, Guindo CO, Dolo A, Niare K, Koïta F, Niangaly A, Rausch KM, Zeguime A, Guindo MA, Bah A, Abebe Y, James ER, Manoj A, Murshedkar T, Kc N, Sim BKL, Billingsley PF, Richie TL, Hoffman SL, Doumbo O, Duffy PE. Safety and efficacy of a three-dose regimen of Plasmodium falciparum sporozoite vaccine in adults during an intense malaria transmission season in Mali: a randomised, controlled phase 1 trial. Lancet Infect Dis. 2021 Nov 18:S1473-3099(21)00332-7. doi: 10.1016/S1473-3099(21)00332-7. Epub ahead of print. PMID: 34801112.
 Mwakingwe-Omari A, Healy SA, Lane J, Cook DM, Kalhori S, Wyatt C, Kolluri A, Marte-Salcedo O, Imeru A, Nason M, Ding LK, Decederfelt H, Duan J, Neal J, Raiten J, Lee G, Hume JCC, Jeon JE, Ikpeama I, Kc N, Chakravarty S, Murshedkar T, Church LWP, Manoj A, Gunasekera A, Anderson C, Murphy SC, March S, Bhatia SN, James ER, Billingsley PF, Sim BKL, Richie TL, Zaidi I, Hoffman SL, Duffy PE. Two chemoattenuated PfSPZ malaria vaccines induce sterile hepatic immunity. Nature. 2021 Jun 30. doi: 10.1038/s41586-021-03684-z.

Awards and distinctions

Awards 

1992 Best Scientific Paper Award, Naval Medical Research Institute, Fifty Years of Scientific Excellence 1942–1992. "Protection Against Malaria by Vaccination with Sporozoite Surface Protein 2 Plus CS Protein." Science, 1991
 1992 Bailey K. Ashford Medal from the American Society of Tropical Medicine and Hygiene for, "Outstanding contributions to the field of tropical medicine by a scientist less than 45 years of age."
 1993 Legion of Merit Medal; United States Navy: awarded for scientific accomplishments
 1994 The Colonel George W. Hunter III Certificate, 1994; For excellence as senior lecturer in Tropical Medicine at the Walter Reed Army Institute of Research
 1998 The Captain Robert Dexter Conrad Award, for outstanding contributions in the field of research and development for the Department of the Navy presented by Chief of Naval Research
 2000 2nd Legion of Merit Medal; United States Navy: awarded for scientific accomplishments and presented by the Secretary of the Navy
 2006 Joseph Augustine Le Prince Medal, awarded by the American Society of Tropical Medicine and Hygiene, "In recognition of outstanding work in the field of malariology"
 2007 Asbury Park High School Distinguished Alumni Hall of Fame
 2015 Best Biotech CEO, Vaccine Industry Excellence (ViE) Awards, World Vaccine Congress
 2015 CEO of the Year, Tech Council of Maryland
 2016 Alumni Association Award of Distinction, Weill Cornell Medical College
 2016 Innovator of the Year, Daily Record
 2020 Clara Southmayd Ludlow Medal from the American Society of Tropical Medicine and Hygiene for " inspirational and pioneering spirit, whose work represents success despite obstacles and advances the field of tropical medicine"

Memberships 

 American Society of Tropical Medicine and Hygiene (member 1978, fellow 2012)
 Infectious Diseases Society of America (elected fellow 1988)
 American Society for Clinical Investigation (elected 1990)
 Association of American Physicians (elected 2003)
 National Academy of Medicine (elected 2004)
 American Academy of Microbiology (fellow 2005)
 American Association for the Advancement of Science (fellow 2008)
 American Academy of Family Physicians (member 2016)

Personnel Life 
Hoffman is married to B. Kim Lee Sim, PhD, a molecular biologist, who is the founder and president of Protein Potential LLC and executive vice president of Sanaria Inc.  They have three children (Alexander [JD], Seth [MD], and Benjamin [MD, PhD]).

References 

1948 births
Pharmaceutical company founders
American company founders
Asbury Park High School alumni
Chief executives in the pharmaceutical industry
People from Belmar, New Jersey
People from Ocean Township, Monmouth County, New Jersey
Scientists from New Jersey
Weill Cornell Medical College alumni
University of California, San Diego faculty
United States Navy Medical Corps officers
University of Pennsylvania alumni
20th-century American physicians
Physicians from New Jersey
Vaccinologists
21st-century American physicians
21st-century American businesspeople
American chief executives
American immunologists
Living people